"Bad Boy for Life" is a song by American rappers P. Diddy, Black Rob and Mark Curry, featured on Diddy's 2001 third album The Saga Continues.... Produced by Megahertz (Dorsey Wesley), it was released as the second single from the album in July 2001 and reached number 33 on the US Billboard Hot 100 chart.

Background
“Bad Boy for Life” was produced in 1998, but later released in 2001. In reviews of the album, "Bad Boy for Life" has been identified as a declaration of strength by Diddy's label Bad Boy Records. Jason Birchmeier of music website Allmusic explains that the song summarises the claim "that [the] Bad Boy empire is in fact still an empire", while Entertainment Weekly reviewer David Browne similarly points out the lyric "It's official/I survived what I been through" as a declaration of strength. Soren Baker of the Los Angeles Times identifies "Bad Boy for Life", in addition to previous single "Let's Get It", as particularly important to the success of the album.

Music video
The music video for "Bad Boy for Life" was directed by Chris Robinson, filmed in June 2001 and released in early July, and features a number of cameo appearances including guitarist Dave Navarro, drummer Travis Barker, actor Ben Stiller, actor Richard Dunn, rappers Xzibit, Ice Cube, Snoop Dogg and Fonzworth Bentley, boxer Mike Tyson, television host Pat O'Brien, basketball players Shaquille O'Neal and Baron Davis and rap rock band Crazy Town. The video was nominated for Best Rap Video at both the 2002 MVPA Awards and the 2002 MTV Video Music Awards.

In other media
The song was used in the 2015 comedy movie Get Hard, as well as part of a remix/mashup with Bad Boys by Inner Circle in the trailers for the 2020 film Bad Boys for Life, the third installment in the Bad Boys film franchise.

Tom Brady and the New England Patriots also heavily used the song during their Super Bowl LIII run.

Jesy Nelson's 2021 debut single "Boyz", featuring Nicki Minaj, prominently samples the baseline and the final lyrics of the song.

Track listing

Credits and samples

"Bad Boy for Life"
Performed by P. Diddy, Black Rob and Mark Curry
Produced by Megahertz Music Group
Vocal production by Harve "Joe Hooker" Pierre
"Let's Get It"
Performed by Three The... featuring G. Dep, P. Diddy and Black Rob
Produced by Yogi
Additional production by Mario "Yellow Man" Winans
Vocal production by Harve "Joe Hooker" Pierre
Contains excerpts of "Love & Happiness" by Al Green

"Let's Get It" (remix)
Performed by Three The... featuring Kain, Mark Curry, Loon, G. Dep, P. Diddy and Black Rob
"Can't Believe"
Performed by Faith Evans featuring Carl Thomas
Produced by Sean "P. Diddy" Combs and Mario "Yellow Man" Winans
Contains excerpts from "Phone Tap" by The Firm
"Hoodfellaz"
Performed by The Hoodfellaz
Produced by Yogi

Chart performance

Weekly charts

Year-end charts

References

2001 singles
2001 songs
Sean Combs songs
Arista Records singles
Bad Boy Records singles
Music videos directed by Chris Robinson (director)